Paul Hicks (born 22 June 1977) is an English former professional rugby league footballer who played in the 1990s and 2000s.

References

External links
Wales World Cup 2008 Campaign Begins
Reds rout the Bulldogs
Giants march on

1977 births
Living people
Batley Bulldogs players
Dewsbury Rams players
English rugby league players
Rugby league players from Wakefield
Rugby league props
Wakefield Trinity players